"Cherokee Fiddle" is a song written by Michael Martin Murphey. Murphey's version of the song went to number 58 on the Hot Country Singles chart in 1977. The story is based on a  fiddle player named "Scooter"; his real name was Dean Kirk. He was of Choctaw Indian and Irish descent. Having taken lessons as a child from Clayton McMichem, he  played the fiddle his entire life. He once worked with the country music and movie star, Rex Allen. In his later years he played at the narrow gauge train station in Silverton, Colorado.

In 1979, the song was recorded by American country music artist Johnny Lee. His version was included on the soundtrack album for the 1980 motion picture Urban Cowboy. A remixed version was re-released in October 1982 as the first single from Lee's album Sounds Like Love.  This version reached number 10 on the Billboard Hot Country Singles chart. The 1982 remix features backing vocals from Murphey and Rosemary Butler and fiddle by Charlie Daniels, while the original mix features backing vocals from Butler, Marcy Levy and Tom Kelly and fiddle by Byron Berline. Furthermore, Lee did a complete re-recording of the song for his 1990 compilation "The Best of Johnny Lee".

Chart performance

Michael Martin Murphey

Johnny Lee

References

Songs about Native Americans
Songs about fiddles
Songs about country music
Songs about musicians
1977 songs
1977 singles
1982 singles
Michael Martin Murphey songs
Johnny Lee (singer) songs
Songs written by Michael Martin Murphey
Song recordings produced by Jim Ed Norman
Asylum Records singles